The Nair Service Society (NSS) is an organisation created for the social advancement and welfare of the Nair community that is found primarily in the state of Kerala in Southern part of India. It was established under the leadership of Mannathu Padmanaban. The NSS is a three-tier organisation with Karayogams at the base level, Taluk Unions at the intermediate level and a central headquarters operating from Perunna, Changanassery in Kerala. G. Sukumaran Nair is the present General Secretary.

The Society owns and manages many educational institutions, hospitals, hostels and agricultural estates.

Origins

The Nair Service Society was formed on 31 October 1914 as a reaction to perceived communal slights in the princely state of Travancore in southern India, which now forms a part of the state of Kerala. At the time of formation, K. Kelappan was the president and Mannathu Padmanabhan was the secretary. Nairs were the most economically and socially dominant community, as well as the most numerous, in what was traditionally a staunchly Hindu kingdom that rigorously and officially enforced distinctions between castes. Some Nairs had felt provoked by the rise to prominence of the Saint Thomas Christians during the era of British rule and whose members were being elected as chairs of various official bodies during a period when the political systems were being modified.

The Nairs believed Travancore to be a Hindu state and the founders of the NSS believed that their own community could only counter the changing socio-political situation if it presented a united front and did away with its internal social subdivisions. The first caste association of this type to have been formed in the region was the Sree Narayana Dharma Paripalana Yogam (SNDP), established in 1903 to work for the benefit of the Ezhava community.

Branches

Expatriate Nairs both in other states of India as well as in foreign countries have formed Nair Service Societies in their states and countries of domicile. Examples are Karnataka Nair Service Society with 30 Karayogams and the Kanyakumari Nair Service Society with 27 Karayogams,  NSS Vidarbha, which unites Nairs living in the Vidarbha region of Maharashtra. NSS is also having branches in Nagpur, Chandrapur and NSS of North America (NSSONA) with many Karayogams in North America.

In 2010 October, Nair organisations from around the world decided to form a united body. As a result, the Global Nair Service Society was founded after a meeting attended by thousands in New Delhi.

Strength
 the NSS comprised:
 Taluk Unions                      : 58
 Karayogams (village/urban communities) : 5300
  Vanitha Samajams                 : 4232
  Bala Samajams                    : 2466

NSS has also started many schools under its supervision directly and also under many of its units like Taluk Unions and Karayogams. Collectively named NSS HSS or NSS High Schools, these schools function in almost all parts of the state of Kerala.

The official organ of the organization is a bi-weekly named 'SERVICE'  - which has completed its 100 years in 2019.

Officers
Past presidents include K. Kelappan who was the first president of NSS and K. P. Karunakara Menon.

See also
 List of Nairs
C V Devan Nair, former President of Singapore
Pattom Thanupillai 
C. Krishna Pillai
 List of Nair Service Society educational institutions
 Nair
 Chattampi Swamikal
 Mannathu Padmanabha Pillai

References
Notes

Citations

External links
Nair Service Society

Kerala society
Organisations based in Kerala
Nair
Malayali organizations
1914 establishments in India
Changanassery
Kottayam